was a town located in Akumi District, Yamagata Prefecture, Japan.

As of 2003, the town had an estimated population of 7,065 and a population density of 39.42 persons per km2. The total area was 179.22 km2.

On November 1, 2005, Hirata, along with the towns of Matsuyama and Yawata (all from Akumi District), was merged into the expanded city of Sakata.

External links
 Sakata official website 

Dissolved municipalities of Yamagata Prefecture
Sakata, Yamagata